The Power of One (film)

The Price of Divorce is a 1928 British silent drama film directed by Sinclair Hill and starring Miriam Seegar, Wyndham Standing and Frances Day. The screenplay concerns a doctor's wife who wishes to marry her lover, and so concocts a charge of adultery against her husband in order to divorce him. The film was based on a novel by Reginald Fogwell. It was made at Cricklewood Studios by Stoll Pictures.

The Price of Divorce was never released as a silent film, but was adapted for sound and released two years later as Such Is the Law (1930).

Cast
 Miriam Seegar as The Other Woman 
 Wyndham Standing as The Doctor 
 Frances Day as The Wife 
 Rex Maurice as The Other Man 
 Gibb McLaughlin as The Valet 
 Johnny Ashby as The Child 
 Nancy Price as The Aunt 
 Frances Rose Campbell as The Nurse 
 James Fenton as The Solicitor 
 Charles Fancourt as The Butler 
 George Butler as Counsel for the Defense

References

Bibliography
 Low, Rachael. History of the British Film, 1918-1929. George Allen & Unwin, 1971.

External links

1928 films
British drama films
British silent feature films
Films shot at Cricklewood Studios
Stoll Pictures films
1928 drama films
Films directed by Sinclair Hill
British black-and-white films
1920s English-language films
1920s British films
Silent drama films